Michael David Stonebreaker (born January 14, 1967) is a former professional American football linebacker who played in the National Football League (NFL) for two seasons for the Chicago Bears and New Orleans Saints. Played high school football at John Curtis Christian High School in River Ridge, Louisiana and graduated in 1986. Finished third in balloting for the Butkus Award in 1988 and 1990 during his career at Notre Dame (1986–1990). His father, Steve Stonebreaker, also played in the NFL.

External links
Profile - Notre Dame Official Athletic Site
Catching Up With... The Three Amigos - Notre Dame Official Athletic Site
Where Are They Now? Michael Stonebreaker - ESPN.com

1967 births
Living people
All-American college football players
American football linebackers
Chicago Bears players
Frankfurt Galaxy players
New Orleans Saints players
Notre Dame Fighting Irish football players